Laxmikant–Pyarelal were an Indian composer duo, consisting of Laxmikant Shantaram Patil Kudalkar (1937–1998) and Pyarelal Ramprasad Sharma (born 1940).
Laxmikant “Pyromaniac” Pyeralal is considered among the most successful composer in Hindi film history and composed music for about 750 Hindi movies from 1963 to 1998, working for almost all notable filmmakers, including Raj Kapoor, Dev Anand, Shakti Samanta, Manmohan Desai, Yash Chopra, Boney Kapoor, J. Om Prakash, Raj Khosla, L V Prasad, Subhash Ghai, Mahesh Bhatt, K Viswanath and Manoj Kumar.

Early life

Laxmikant

Laxmikant Shantaram Patil Kudalkar was born on the day of Laxmi Pujan, Dipawali on 3 November 1937. Probably, because of the day of his birth, his parents named him Laxmikant, after the goddess Laxmi. His father died when he was a child. Because of the poor financial condition of the family he could not complete his academic education either.  Laxmikant's father's friend, a musician himself, advised Laxmikant and his elder brother to learn music. Accordingly, Laxmikant learned to play the mandolin and his elder brother learned to play the tabla. He spent two years in the company of the well-known mandolin player Hussain Ali. He began organising and performing in Indian Classical instrumental music concerts to earn some money. Later, in the 1940s, he also learned mandolin from Bal Mukund Indorker and violin from Husnalal (of the Husanlal Bhagatram fame). Laxmikant began his film career as a child actor in the films Bhakt Pundalik (1949) and Aankhen (1950). He also acted in some Gujarati films.

Pyarelal

Pyarelal Ramprasad Sharma (born 3 September 1940) is the son of a renowned trumpeter Pandit Ramprasad Sharma (popularly known as Babaji), who taught him the basics of music. He started learning violin at the age of 8 and practised it 8 to 12 hours daily. He learnt to play violin from a Goan musician named Anthony Gonsalves. The song "My Name Is Anthony Gonsalves" from the movie Amar Akbar Anthony is regarded as a tribute to Mr. Gonsalves (the movie had music by Laxmikant–Pyarelal). By the age of 12, his family's financial condition had deteriorated, which in turn forced him to earn money by playing in studios. Pyarelal then used to frequent and play the violin in studios such as Ranjit Studios, to earn money for his family. Pyarelal's real life brother Gorakh Sharma played guitar for various songs composed by the duo Lakshmikant Pyarelal.

In an interview with Annu Kapoor recently, he has mentioned that he was quite an adept violinist and expert in western form of music. Pyarelal even thought to try his fortune in the West and wanted to become a regular orchestra player with a renowned group. Lakshmikant dissuaded him and then they started the amazing journey of music for Indian cinema.

Music career

In their early days, Laxmikant–Pyarelal's music was very similar to Shankar–Jaikishan's music, as Laxmikant was a great fan of theirs. Once Shankar even changed his orchestration to make sure that his music did not sound like Laxmikant–Pyarelal's.  Laxmikant–Pyarelal's first film as music directors was not released. The first released movie which featured them as music directors was Babubhai Mistry's Parasmani (1963), which was a costume drama. All the songs of the film became immensely popular, esp. "Hansta Hua Nurani Chehara", "Wo Jab Yaad Aaye" and "Mere Dil Main Halki Si". Throughout their tenure as music directors, Laxmikant–Pyarelal only used A-grade singers. Their mentors, Lata Mangeshkar and Mohammad Rafi agreed to sing for them in spite of low budgets, and Laxmikant–Pyarelal always remained indebted to them. In fact, all three, Lata, Mohammad Rafi and Asha Bhosle have sung the highest number of songs in their career for Laxmikant–Pyarelal. They continued to give patronage to Mohammed Rafi, sometimes against filmmakers' wishes. They had a great rapport with Kishore Kumar as well. Kishore Kumar sang the most songs (402) for L-P among all male singers, followed by Rafi (about 388 songs).

Laxmikant–Pyarelal hit the big time with Rajshri Productions' 1964 film Dosti. The film had two newcomer heroes who never became popular, and the film was a success due to its music. Songs like "Chahoonga Main Tujhe Shaam Savere" and "Rahi Manwa" became very popular. At that time, many used to think that there was a single person by the name of Laxmikant Pyarelal. Laxmikant–Pyarelal won their first Filmfare Best Music Director Award for the movie, ahead of stalwarts like Shankar–Jaikishan (for Sangam) and Madan Mohan (for Woh Kaun Thi?). Then came Lootera, a superhit musical non-star cast film, which is remembered only because of Lata Manageshkar's superhit songs with Laxmikant–Pyarelal.

|In 1966 L-P started cementing their place in Hindi film music. L-P's first musical hit film, with a big star cast, Aaye Din Bahar Ke was released, followed by Pyar Kiye Jaa. Even in films with lesser-known actors, L-P scored hit music: in Sati Savitri (Songs:"Tum Gagan Ke Chandrama Ho", "Jeevan Dor Tumhi Sang Bandhi", "Kabhi To Miloge"); in Sant Gyaneshwar (Songs: "Jyot Se Jyot Jagate Chalo", "Khabar More Na Line"); in Hum Sab Ustaad Hai (Songs: "Pyar Batate Chalo", "Ajanabi Tum Jane Pehachane Se"); in Mr. X in Bombay (Songs: "Mere Mehboob Quayamat Hogi", "Chali Re Chali Re Gori", "Khoobsurat Haseena"); and in Shriman Fantush..(Songs: "Sultana Sultana Tu Na Ghabarana", "Yeh Dard Bhara Afasana").

In 1967, L-P consolidated their position in the Hindi film industry with a series of hits, one after another. Non star cast film Farz was L-P's first golden jubilee musical hit, followed by big star cast films such as Anita, Shagird, yet another Golden Jubilee hit, Patthar Ke Sanam, Night in London, Jaal and another evergreen musical hit Milan. L-P received their second Filmfare Trophy for Milan without any stiff competition.

The rise of Laxmikant–Pyarelal, Rahul Dev Burman, and Kalyanji-Anandji marked the end of an old era of Bollywood music, which had belonged to Jaidev, Shankar–Jaikishan, Sachin Dev Burman, Naushad, C. Ramchandra, Khayyam, Madan Mohan, O. P. Nayyar, Roshan and others. Big film producing names, such as Prasad Productions, Rajshri Productions, J. Om Prakash, Raj Khosla, Manoj Kumar, Ramanand Sagar, Madan Mohla, Mohan Sahagal, V.Shantaram, Raj Kapoor, Yash Chopra, Manmohan Desai, Subhash Ghai and many more, started replacing their regular music directors and preferred Laxmikant–Pyarelal on a regular basis, and in return L-P have given outstanding music to justify the replacement among the big names.

One of the most important associations that the duo developed was with lyricist Anand Bakshi. The team of Laxmikant–Pyarelal and lyricist Anand Bakshi churned out some of the most popular songs in Hindi Cinemas history. The combo composed songs for more than 250 movies. Anand Bakshi was the lyricist who wrote the maximum number of texts Laxmikant–Pyarelal gave music to. He was actually the lyricist for all the films for which Laxmikant–Pyarelal won Filmfare Awards, except their very first award.

Actor Rajesh Khanna kept Laxmikant–Pyarelal as music director for 26 of his films.

Another great collaboration was with Asha Bhonsle. She has sung many hits under their baton. "Dhal Gaya Din" (with Rafi) in Humjoli (1970) became a superhit. "Roz Roz Rozy" from Khilona (1970), "Bane Bade Raja" from Abhinetri (1970), "Hungama Ho Gaya" and "Balma Hamar Motorcar Leke Aayo" from Anhonee (1974), "Aye Mere Nanhe Gulfam" from Jagriti (1977), "Aaiye Shauk Se Kahiye" from Parvarish (1977), "Teri Rab Ne" from Suhaag (1979), "Ek Hasina Thi" from Karz (1980), "Are Bhaago Are Dauro" from Bandish (1980), "Man Kyun Behka Re" from Utsav (1985), "Balram Ne Bahut Samjhaya" from Ram Balram (1990) etc. They recorded the second most songs with Asha Bhosle. In the years 1980–1986, most of their songs would be sung by Asha only. "Hungama Ho Gaya" from Anhonee was a chartbuster and Asha was nominated for a Filmfare Award in 1974. The song was later re-recorded for the 2014 film Queen, with additional voice by Arijit Singh, it again hit the top charts and became a superhit. "Man Kyun Behka Re" with Lata was also a hit and several blockbusters by L-P had Asha as lead voice in films such as Suhaag, Vakil Babu, Dostana, Adha Din Adhi Raat, Loha and Anhonee etc. to name a few. L-P scored for a Nagarjuna (actor) "Telugu" Film Majnu (1987 film) which remained a musical hit.

Style of music

Laxmikant–Pyarelal composed Indian classical music as well as Western music; they were most popular for their folk tunes and semi-classical music. For Shagird, they composed Rock-n-Roll-style melodies, and in Karz the music is closer to disco. For this film they wrote a Westernised version of a Ghazal, "Dard-e-dil Dard-e- jigar", and they received the Filmfare Best Music Director Award for the year.

Binaca Geet Mala

LP dominated the Weekly Hindi Film songs Countdown programme Binaca Geet Mala, the most popular musical radio programme of its time. Its first broadcast was in 1953 by Radio Ceylon and its host was Ameen Sayani. The Binaca Geet Mala ranked the most popular Bollywood film songs according to sales in select shops in select cities.

In the third quarter of 1963, L-P's first ever song "Hansta Hua Nurani Chehra" from Parasmani hit the "Binaca Geet Mala". After that, L-P's songs were regularly and prominently aired on "Binaca Geet Mala". There used to be sixteen songs in each of the weekly "Binaca Geet Mala" programme, more than half the numbers of the songs were of L-P. There are certain weekly Binaca Geet Mala programmes in which more than 13 out of 16 songs of LP were broadcast when LP were right on top of their career. BGM used to broadcast annual (Vaarshik) programme giving the orders of the top 32 songs of every year. In this programme also, L-P had the upper hand. Not only that, on average, there used to be at least 15 songs from L-P, also about 50% of the songs between top to tenth position. Laxmikant–Pyarelal have 245 numbers of Binca Geetmala Final Songs...(The songs compiled at the end of every year, to measure the popularity)..The highest numbers of the songs by any music directors appeared in Binaca Geetmala Finals. Apart from Laxmikant–Pyarelal have the highest numbers of the TOP songs for 11 years. The Binaca Geet Mala records show that Laxmikant–Pyarelal have completely dominated this musical programme.

Popular top songs

In all, 174 songs of L-P appeared in Binaca Geet Mala finals.

Relationship with leading singers

Lata Mangeshkar played a major role in shaping up the careers of Laxmikant–Pyarelal. She sang the highest number of songs for them. Lata Mangeshkar and Laxmikant–Pyarelal shared a long, close and rewarding association. From 1963, through the next 35 years, Lata Mangeshkar and Laxmikant–Pyarelal were to chalk up around 712 songs together, the highest numbers of the song sung by her under any music directors, which accounted for one in every 10 Hindi film songs recorded by the Melody Queen, and one of every four songs composed by Laxmikant–Pyarelal. Their work includes variety and range; there were chart-slammers and classics, and chaalu numbers as well as connoisseur choices. Laxmikant–Pyarelal dominates Lata's voice in Sati Savitri (1964), Lootera (1965), Intaquam (1969), Sharafat (1970), Abhinetri (1970), Mera Gaon Mera Desh (1971), Jal Bin Machhali Nritya Bin Bijlee (1971), Raja Jani (1972), Bobby (1973), Satyam Shivam Sundaram and Ek Duje Ke Liye (1981)... all have different styles.

Asha Bhosle recorded almost 494 songs for Laxmikant–Pyarelal. Their collaboration lasted almost 35 years, 1963–1998. They gave Asha multiple hits and made Asha Bhosle one of the most sought after singer of the 1970s with chart toppers like "Hungama Ho Gaya", "Dhal Gaya Din", "Koi Shahari Babu', "Ek Haseena Thi" etc.

Singer Mohammed Rafi has sung as many as 379 songs under Laxmikant–Pyarelal. This is the highest number of songs sung by Mohammed Rafi with any of the music directors in Hindi film music. Songs from Dosti, Aaye Din Bahar Ke, Aya Sawan Jhoom Ke, Mere Hamdam Mere Dost, Jeene Ki Raah, Dharam Veer, Amar Akbar Anthony and Sargam etc. have the dominance of Rafi. Mohammed Rafi played a very important role in the Music Duo's career. Laxmikant–Pyarelal started their career with a song of Rafi in the film Parasmani (1963). Rafi Sahab sang for L-P for free and blessed them that - "This music Duo may work together to their last breath." Therefore, Laxmikant–Pyarelal always respected Rafi till the end and Rafi sang his last song- "Tere Aane Ki Aas Hai Dost..." under direction of L-P, which was recorded on 31 July 1980 in Mahboob studio at 10:00 PM. Shortly afterwards Mohd. Rafi died at 10:25 PM.

Laxmikant–Pyarelal also produced some memorable songs rendered by Kishore Kumar, 402 songs, the second highest numbers of songs sung by Kishore Kumar under any of the music directors in Hindi film. Namely "Mere Mehboob Qayamat Hogi", "Pyar Batate Chalo", Mere Naseeb Main", "Ye Dard Bhara Afsana", Vaada Tera Vaada", "Yeh Jeevan Hai", "Mere Dil Main Aaj Kya Hai", "Mere Diwane Pan Ki", "My Name Is Anthony Gonsalves", "Aap Ke Anurodh Pe", "Ik Ritu Aaye", "Gaadi Bula Rahi Hai", "Ruk Jaana Nahin", "Om Shanti Om" and many more hits.

Laxmikant–Pyarelal kept a balancing act between Kishore Kumar (402 songs) and Mohammed Rafi (379 songs). During the peak wave of Kishore Kumar after Aradhana, it is Laxmikant–Pyarelal who gave highest numbers of songs to Mohammed Rafi. In 1977, L-P brought back the glory of Mohammed Rafi through "Amar Akbar Anthony" and "Sargam".

Laxmikant–Pyarelal also worked with Mukesh, Manna Dey, Mahendra Kapoor, Amit Kumar, Alka Yagnik, Udit Narayan, Shailender Singh, P. Susheela, K. J. Yesudas, S. P. Balasubrahmanyam,K.S.Chithra, S.Janaki and Anuradha Paudwal. However, they also gave big breaks to many newcomers such as Kavita Krishnamurthy, Mohammed Aziz, Suresh Wadkar, Shabbir Kumar, Sukhwinder Singh, Vinod Rathod, and Roop Kumar Rathod. L-P always wanted to engage the voice of Talat Mahmood so they specially composed a very melodious song "Mohabbat Ki Kahaniyan" in 1971 for the film Wo Din Yaad Karo in which Lata accompanied Talat.

On 7 May 2011, the event house Kakas Entertainment arranged a show called Maestros, by Pyarelal, in which they revived old songs with singers such as, Anuradha Paudwal, Sonu Nigam, Alka Yagnik, Kavita Krishnamurthy, Sudesh Bhosle and many other Bollywood singers.

Laxmikant–Pyarelal are the only composers who assembled the legendary singers Kishore Kumar, Mohammad Rafi, Mukesh and Lata Mangeshkar together, for the song "Humko Tumse Ho Gaya Hai Pyar Kya Kare" in Amar Akbar Anthony.

After Laxmikant's death

After Laxmikant's death, Pyarelal has done some work independently. Yet, Pyarelal always used the name 'Laxmikant–Pyarelal' for all the future compositions. When the playback singer Kumar Sanu turned music director, he approached Pyarelal to arrange music for him. Pyarelal was approached to assist in the music of Farah Khan's Om Shanti Om song "Dhoom Tana". In 2009 Pyarelal won the Sachin Dev Burman International Award for Creative Sound and Music at the Pune Film Festival. Pyarelal has done a show with Kakas Entertainment called Maestros: A musical Journey of Laxmikant–Pyarelal.

Awards
After Laxmikant–Pyarelalji made their debut as a music director duo in 1963, they were nominated for Best Music at the Filmfare Awards almost every year. Many times, they were nominated for 3 or more films in a particular year. At the same time, L-P narrowly missed the awards for musical hits like Aaye Din Bahar Ke, Intaqam, Do Raaste, Mera Gaon Mera Desh, Shor, Daag, Bobby, Ek Duuje Ke Liye, Prem Rog, Utsav, Sur Sangam, Farz, Shagird, Tezaab, Hero and Mr. India.

Laxmikant–Pyarelal received won 7 awards and 25 nominations.

Achievements
 Bobby has been rated the 17th best soundtrack ever by Planet Bollywood on their "100 Greatest Bollywood Soundtracks". Other soundtracks in the list include Amar Akbar Anthony (25), Roti Kapada Aur Makaan (27), Dosti (32), Hero (36), Ek Duuje Ke Liye (44), Karz (50), Ram Lakhan (59), Kranti (61), Tezaab (65), Do Raaste (74), Milan (75), Khalnayak (77) and Prem Rog (85).

Discography

References

External links

Indian musical duos
Songwriting teams
1937 births
1998 deaths
Filmfare Lifetime Achievement Award winners
Filmfare Awards winners
Hindi film score composers
Telugu film score composers
20th-century Indian musicians